John J. "Rabbit" Hemingsley (also spelled Heminsley) was a U.S. soccer center forward who played the first two U.S. national team games in 1916.  He spent seven seasons in the National Association Football League and five in the American Soccer League.

Professional career
Hemingsley was a resident of Kearny, New Jersey. fIn 1914, Hemingsley began his professional career with the Kearny Scots of the National Association Football League.  Kearny won the 1915 American Cup.  He then played with New York F.C. for the 1916-1917 season and the 1917-1918 season with West Hudson A.A.  He played the 1918-1919 season with Philadelphia Merchant Ship.  In 1919, he traveled with Bethlehem Steel F.C. on the team’s tour of Scandinavia.  Hemingsley is listed with Paterson F.C. in July 1920. He then played at least the 1920-1921 season with Erie A.A.  When the NAFBL folded in 1921, Erie moved to the first American Soccer League where it played under the name, Harrison S.C.  In 1923, he moved to Paterson F.C., but after ten games, was transferred to the Newark Skeeters for the end of the season.  In 1924, he began the season with J&P Coats, but after only three games, returned to the Skeeters where he remained through the end of the 1925-1926 season.

National team
Hemingsley earned two caps with the national team in 1916.  In the first official U.S. national team game, the U.S. defeated Sweden on August 20, 1916.  On September 3, 1916, Hemingsley and his team mates tied Norway before returning to the U.S.

External links
 National Soccer Hall of Fame eligibility profile

References

Soccer players from Newark, New Jersey
American soccer players
American Soccer League (1921–1933) players
Erie A.A. (NAFBL) players
Harrison S.C. players
J&P Coats players
Kearny Scots (NAFBL) players
National Association Football League players
New York F.C. players
Newark Skeeters players
Paterson F.C. players
Paterson F.C. (NAFBL) players
People from Kearny, New Jersey
Philadelphia Merchant Ship players
Sportspeople from Hudson County, New Jersey
United States men's international soccer players
West Hudson A.A. players
Year of death missing
Association football forwards
Year of birth missing